Patati Patatá is a Brazilian clown duo, with the brand having been active since 1983, and being known throughout Brazil and in a some other Latin countries. In 2010, they launched the Brincando com Patati and Patatá music collection via Som Livre, which was subsequently certified as a diamond record, with over 300 thousand copies sold. In a 2018 interview to the Brazilian TV hostess Eliana, Rinaldi Faria, owner of the Patati Patatá brand, stated that at the time there are 6 clown duos actively travelling and the same time.

The 2010s lead clows of the duo were also invited to be featured at the Rosas de Ouro samba school's parade with the samba-plot (samba enredo) "Unforgettable", at the 2014 carnival in São Paulo.

Background 
Then a group of several artists, Patati Patatá was composed by Garota Pupy, Mágica Alacazam, and clowns Tuti Fruti and Pirulito. They found initial success in 1983 with the album No Reino Encantado dos Animais. Now-manager Rinaldi Faria was a magician and presenter for the group. A car crash in 1985, however, ended up killing three of the group's performers; to finish their ongoing tour, Rinaldi and his brother took the place of deceased clowns. The brand then folded its activities.

Rinaldi bought the rights to the Patati Patatá brand in 1989, and started its second iteration, initially replicating the group format. It was soon decided that the focus would be instead on the clown duo, and several DVDs featuring them were released starting from 2003, which progressively drew more attention to their image.

The duo's breakthrough came with a television debut taking place in 2011, as presenters of the children's program Carrossel Animado broadcast by SBT, shortly after they started to present the program Bom Dia & Companhia on the same station. In 2013, the TV show received a redesign, but ended up being canceled in the same year.

The year of 2014 saw their first international presentations in Europe.  In 2015, a new TV show debuted in the  Discovery Kids channel, entitled Parque Patati Patatá.

Discography 
Patati Patatá
Patati Patatá
Super Sucessos Infantis (Vol. 1)
Super Sucessos Infantis (Vol. 2)
Super Sucessos Infantis (Vol. 3)
Super Sucessos Infantis (Vol. 4)
Super Sucessos Infantis (Vol. 5)
Super Sucessos Infantis (Vol. 6)
Na Cidade dos Sonhos (Vol. 7)
Os Grandes Sucessos (Vol. 9)
No Castelo da Fantasia (Vol. 8)
Hora da Folia (Vol. 10)
Volta ao Mundo (Vol. 11)
Coletânea de Sucessos (Vol. 1)
A Vida é Bela
O Melhor da Pré-escola (Vol. 1)

Secondary characters

Maluquinhos

Maluquinhos do Patati Patatá are characters created to accompany the clown duo in their shows, tours and presentations everywhere. The role of the characters is to act as stagehands and dancers.

References

External links 
 

Brazilian clowns
Brazilian children's television series
Television shows about clowns
Children's musicians
Sistema Brasileiro de Televisão original programming